This is a list of European Union (EU) member states by population, which is sorted by the 2020 population figure as provided by Eurostat.

Table

See also 

 
 List of countries by population
 List of countries by past and future population
 List of member states of the Commonwealth of Nations by population
 Countries by population, sorted by continent:
 List of African countries by population
 List of Asian countries by population
 List of European countries by population
 List of North American countries by population
 List of Oceanian countries by population
 List of South American countries by population
 Countries by population, sorted by region:
 List of countries in the Americas by population
 List of Arab countries by population
 List of Caribbean countries by population
 List of Eurasian countries by population
 List of Latin American countries by population
 List of Middle Eastern countries by population
 
 List of countries by population in 2000
 List of countries by population in 2010

Notes 

Demographics of the European Union
European Union
European Union
European Union-related lists
European Union